The Sharon Keillor Award for Women in Engineering Education "recognizes and honors outstanding women engineering educators." Recipients hold an earned doctoral degree in an engineering discipline or related field, have at least five years of teaching experience in an engineering school, and have "an outstanding record in teaching engineering students."

The award has been given annually since 2001.

Recipients

See also
 List of engineering awards

References

Science awards honoring women
American Society for Engineering Education
Engineering awards
Education awards